Anywhere Road is an American independent film distributor based in San Francisco. Founded in 2007, Anywhere Road specializes in the distribution, production and sales of independent feature films.

List of Anywhere Road films
 Razor Eaters (2003)
 December Ends (2006)
 Outside Sales (2006)
 Antonia (2006)
 Military Intelligence and You! (2006)
 A Very British Gangster (2008)
 Sinner (2007)
 Black Irish (2007)
 Towncraft (2007)
 Farm Girl in New York (2008)
 Land of Confusion (2008)

External links
 Anywhere Road official website
 IMDB listing

Film distributors of the United States
Film production companies of the United States
Companies based in San Francisco
Cinema of the San Francisco Bay Area